Francis Edward Paxton Whitehead (born 17 October 1937) is an English actor, theatre director, and playwright. He was nominated for a Tony Award and a Drama Desk Award for his performance as Pellinore in the 1980 revival of Camelot. He has had many Broadway roles. He is also known for his film roles and is well known, especially to US and television audiences in general, for his many guest appearances on several US shows, especially guest appearances on major sitcoms of the 1990s, such as Frasier, Caroline in the City, Ellen, 3rd Rock from the Sun, The Drew Carry Show, Mad About You, and Friends.

Early life
Paxton was born in East Malling and Larkfield, Kent, the son of Louise (née Hunt) and Charles Parkin Whitehead. His father was a lawyer. He trained at London's Webber Douglas Academy of Dramatic Art beginning when he was 17 years old.

Career

Paxton worked in repertory, small touring companies that rehearsed and performed a new play each week. In 1958, he was signed by the Royal Shakespeare Company.

In 1961, Whitehead directed Doric Wilson's first play to be performed, And He Made a Her, a comedy, was an off-off-Broadway production at the Caffe Cino. He made his Broadway debut in The Affair (1962) after appearing in Canadian stage and TV productions.

Whitehead replaced Jonathan Miller in the Broadway production of Beyond the Fringe in 1964 and appeared on the LP recording of the show, Beyond the Fringe '64. He went on to appear with the American Shakespeare Company to direct in regional repertory.

Whitehead succeeded Barry Morse as Artistic Director of the Shaw Festival, the only repertory company dedicated to the works of George Bernard Shaw. Under his leadership, it continued to develop into an international event. During his tenure he was able to push through a plan of building the purpose-built 869 seat state-of-the-art Festival Theatre to expand considerably the capacity for audiences at Niagara-on-the-Lake.

Queen Elizabeth II, Indira Gandhi and Pierre Trudeau were among those who attended performances at the Shaw Festival Theatre during its inaugural season in 1973. He served until 1977 and appeared in productions as actor. His notable appearances included The Apple Cart, Major Barbara, The Philanderer, Arms and the Man, Misalliance and Heartbreak House with Jessica Tandy. Whitehead and Suzanne Grossman adapted Georges Feydeau's plays There's One in Every Marriage for the Broadway stage in 1971, and Chemin de Fer in 1974.

Whitehead received an honorary degree in arts from Trent University in 1978 and earned an Antoinette Perry "Tony" Award nomination for Camelot in 1980. He has appeared in numerous Broadway productions including My Fair Lady with Richard Chamberlain, The Harlequin Studies with Bill Irwin, Noël Coward's Suite in Two Keys, Peter Shaffer's Lettice and Lovage, London Suite by Neil Simon and as Sherlock Holmes in The Crucifer of Blood.

He is also well known for his film roles and many guest and recurring appearances on television shows, especially many of the top 90's sitcoms such as Frasier, Caroline in the City, Ellen, 3rd Rock from the Sun, The Drew Carry Show, Mad About You, and Friends. He has also appeared on Magnum, P.I., Murder, She Wrote, Law & Order, The West Wing, and many more. In 2007, he made a cameo in Desperate Housewives as the father of Susan Mayer's fiancée, Ian.  

In recent years, Whitehead has continued to work in regional theatre and on Broadway. Whitehead appeared in the role of Phil at the Westport Country Playhouse in Westport, Connecticut from 12–27 July 2007 in Relatively Speaking, a comedy. Whitehead began previews of The Importance of Being Earnest by Oscar Wilde on Broadway at the American Airlines Theatre on 17 December 2010 in the role of Reverend Canon Chasuble. The show opened on 13 January 2011 and was filmed live on 11/12 March 2011 for broadcast in June 2011. He played the role of George Bernard Shaw in Anthony Wynn's Bernard and Bosie: A Most Unlikely Friendship in a benefit performance for the Episcopal Actors' Guild on 5 May 2011. 

Whitehead is an Associate Artist of the Old Globe Theatre in San Diego. He performs on recordings of Shaw's The Doctor's Dilemma and Harley Granville-Barker's The Voysey Inheritance.

Work
 12 November – 21 December 2014: Plays opposite Frances Barber and Charles Shaughnessy in What the Butler Saw (play) play by Joe Orton (Mark Taper Forum at the Los Angeles Music Center, Los Angeles, California)
 27 July – 7 August 2011: Plays opposite Richard Easton in She Stoops to Conquer play by Oliver Goldsmith (Williamstown Theatre Festival, Williamstown, Massachusetts)
 7 June 2011: Plays Lord Champion-Cheney opposite Marsha Mason in The Circle play by W. Somerset Maugham (Westport Country Playhouse, Westport, Connecticut)
 13 January 2011: Plays Reverend Canon Chasuble opposite Dana Ivey, Santino Fontana, Tim MacDonald, and Paul O'Brien in The Importance of Being Earnest play by Oscar Wilde (Roundabout Theatre Company, American Airlines Theatre, New York City)
 15 November 2010: Plays opposite Geneva Carr, Cecilia Hart and James Waterston in A Song at Twilight play by Noël Coward (Westport Country Playhouse, Westport, Connecticut)
 4 October 2010: Plays opposite Geneva Carr, Cecilia Hart and James Waterston in Bedroom Farce play by Alan Ayckbourn (Westport Country Playhouse, Westport, Connecticut)
 7 September – 24 October 2010: Plays Lafeau opposite Marsha Mason in All's Well That Ends Well play by William Shakespeare (Lansburgh Theatre, Washington, D.C.)
 15 April – 16 May 2010: Plays Gerry in Time of My Life play by Alan Ayckbourn (O'Reilly Theater, Pittsburgh, Pennsylvania)
 16 October – 1 November 2009: Plays Mr. Hardcastle in She Stoops to Conquer play by Oliver Goldsmith (Matthews Theatre, New York City)
 28 July – 15 August 2009: Plays Frank Foster opposite Geneva Carr and Cecilia Hart in How the Other Half Loves play by Alan Ayckbourn (Westport Country Playhouse, Westport, Connecticut)
 13–24 August 2008: Plays opposite Richard Easton and Dana Ivey in Home play by David Storey (Williamstown Theatre Festival, Williamstown, Massachusetts).
 1–26 April 2008: Plays Gerry Stanton opposite Cecilia Hart in Time of My Life play by Alan Ayckbourn (Westport Country Playhouse, Westport, Connecticut).
 12–27 July 2007: Plays Phil opposite Cecilia Hart and James Waterston in Relatively Speaking play by Alan Ayckbourn (Westport Country Playhouse, Westport, Connecticut)
 23 September – 9 November 2003: Plays Pantalone opposite Bill Irwin in The Harlequin Studies play by Bill Irwin (Peter Norton Space, New York City)
 10–16 April 2000: Plays George Hilgay/Sir Hugo Latymer opposite Judith Ivey and Hayley Mills in A Suite in Two Keys play by Noël Coward (Lucille Lortel Theatre, New York City)
 28 March – 3 September 1995: Plays Billy/Sidney/Dr. McMerlin opposite Kate Burton, Jeffrey Jones and Carole Shelley in London Suite play by Neil Simon (Union Square Theatre, New York City)
 5–14 November 1969: Plays opposite Shawn Elliott, Barbara Lang and Peter York in Rondelay play by Jerry Douglas (Hudson West Theatre, New York City)
 2 February – 31 March 1963: Plays Torvald Helmer opposite Alice Drummond, Barnard Hughes and Richard Waring in A Doll's House play by Henrik Ibsen (Theatre Four, New York City)
 18 September 1961: Plays Prosecuting Counsel opposite Joel Fabiani, James Kenny, John Milligan and Anna Russell in One Way Pendulum play by N.F. Simpson (East 74th Street Theatre, New York City)

Stage productions

Actor
Kentish Colt, The Epilogue, The Old Stagers Theatre, Canterbury, England, UK, 1949
Alphonse, All for Mary, Devonshire Park, Eastbourne, England, UK, 1956
Francisco, Hamlet, Royal Shakespeare Company, Stratford-upon-Avon, England, UK, 1958
Sellars, The Grass is Greener, Theatre Royal, Bath, England, UK, 1960
Gallows Humor, Gramercy Arts Theatre, New York City, 1961
Prosecuting counsel, One Way Pendulum, East 74th Street Theatre, New York City, 1961
Gilbert Dawson-Hill, The Affair, Henry Miller's Theatre, 1962
Torvald Helmer, A Doll's House, Theatre Four, New York City, 1963
Gower, Henry V, American Shakespeare Festival, Stratford, CT, USA, 1963
King of France, King Lear, American Shakespeare Festival, Stratford, England, UK, 1963
Horner, The Country Wife, Front Street Theatre, Memphis, TN, USA, 1964
Henry Higgins, My Fair Lady, Front Street Theatre, 1964
Jack Absolute, The Rivals, Charles Playhouse, Boston, MA, USA, 1964
Archie Rice, The Entertainer, Hartford Stage Company, Hartford, CT, USA, 1965
Adolphus Cusins, Major Barbara, Playhouse in the Park, Cincinnati, OH, USA, 1965
Randall Underwood, Heartbreak House, Manitoba Theatre Centre, Winnipeg, Manitoba, Canada, 1965
Christoforou, The Public Eye, Manitoba Theatre Centre, 1965
Algernon, The Importance of Being Earnest, Manitoba Theatre Centre, 1965
John Worthing, The Importance of Being Earnest, Canadian Players, Toronto, Ontario, Canada, 1966
Lord Summerhays, Misalliance, Shaw Festival, Niagara-on-the-Lake, Ontario, Canada, 1966
Magnus, The Apple Cart, Shaw Festival, 1966
Sergius, Arms and the Man, Shaw Festival, 1967
Adolphus Cusins, Major Barbara, Shaw Festival, 1967
Hector Hushabye, Heartbreak House, Shaw Festival, 1968
Coustilliou, The Chemmy Circle, Shaw Festival, 1968
Charley's Aunt, Studio Arena Theatre, Buffalo, NY, USA, 1968
Chemin de Fer, Mark Taper Forum, Los Angeles, USA, 1969
Rondelay, Hudson West Theatre, New York City, 1969
Dubedat, The Doctor's Dilemma, Shaw Festival, 1969
The actor, The Guardsman, Shaw Festival, 1969
Tempest, Forty Years On, Shaw Festival, 1970
The Chemmy Circle, Arena Stage, Washington, D.C., USA, 1970
Hector Hushabye, Heartbreak House, Goodman Memorial Theatre, Chicago, IL., USA, 1970
The Emperor, The Brass Butterfly, Chelsea Theatre Center, New York City, 1970
Reverend Alexander Mill, Candida, Longacre Theatre, New York City, 1970
Canon Throbbing, Habeas Corpus, Martin Beck Theatre, New York City, 1975
Charteris, The Philanderer, Shaw Festival, 1971
Lead roles, Tonight at 8:30, Shaw Festival, 1971
Valentine, You Never Can Tell, Shaw Festival, 1973
Savoyard, Fanny's First Play, Shaw Festival, 1973
Fancourt Babberley, Charley's Aunt, Shaw Festival, 1974
Burgoyne, The Devil's Disciple, Shaw Festival, 1975
Sergius, Arms and the Man, Shaw Festival, 1976
Magnus, The Apple Cart, Shaw Festival, 1976
Adrian, The Millionairess, Shaw Festival, 1976
Ronnie Gamble, Thark, Shaw Festival, 1977
Sherlock Holmes, The Crucifer of Blood, Helen Hayes Theatre, New York City, 1978
Henry Carr, Travesties, Manitoba Theatre Centre, Canada, 1979
Sherlock Holmes, The Crucifer of Blood, Elitch Gardens Theatre, Denver, Colorado, USA, 1979
Title role, The Trials of Oscar Wilde, The Citadel Theatre, Edmonton, Alberta, Canada, 1980
Ronnie Gamble, Thark, Philadelphia Drama Guild, USA, 1980
Malvolio, Twelfth Night, Philadelphia Drama Guild, USA, 1980
Pellinore, Camelot, State Theatre, New York City, 1980
Sergeant of police, The Pirates of Penzance, Ahmanson Theatre, Los Angeles, USA, 1981
Harpagon, The Miser, Old Globe Theatre, San Diego, CA, USA, 1982
Hector, Heartbreak House, Theatre Royal, London, UK, 1983
Anthony Absolute, The Rivals, Old Globe Theatre, San Diego, USA, 1983
Freddy, Noises Off, Brooks Atkinson Theatre, New York City, 1983–85
Title role, Richard III, Old Globe Theatre, San Diego, USA, 1985
Benedick, Much Ado About Nothing, Old Globe Theatre, San Diego, USA, 1986
Richard Willey, Out of Order, Paper Mill Playhouse, Millburn, NJ, USA, 1997
Sherlock Holmes, The Mask of Moriarty, Paper Mill Playhouse, 1998
Narrator, Rocky Horror Show, Tiffany Theater, Hollywood, CA, USA, 1998
Sir Hugo Latymer, A Song at Twilight, Mirage Theater Company, Lucille Lortel Theatre, New York City, 2000
George Hilgay, Shadows of the Evening, Mirage Theater Company, Lucille Lortel Theater, USA, 2000
Xanadu Live, Male, The Gascon Center Theatre, Culver City, CA, USA, 2001
Twelfth Night, Malvolio, Old Globe Theatre, San Diego, CA, USA, 2001
The Circle, Clive Champion-Cheney, South Coast Repertory, Costa Mesa, CA, USA, 2001
Where's Charley, Mr. Spettigue, Williamstown Theatre Festival, Williamstown, MA, USA, 2002
The Voysey Inheritance, Mr. Voysey, Walnut Street Theatre, Philadelphia, PA, USA, 2003
The Harlequin Studies, Pantalone, Peter Norton Space (Off-Broadway), USA, 2003
What the Butler Saw, Dr. Rance, Boston University Theatre, Boston, MA, USA, 2004
Absurd Person Singular, Ronald, Biltmore Theatre (Broadway), USA, 2005
Also appeared in A Little Hotel on the Side; King Lear, Manitoba Theatre Centre; Neil Simon's London Suite.
Tour History
Francisco, Hamlet, Royal Shakespeare Company, Moscow and Leningrad, Soviet Union, 1958
Lead role, The Grass Is Greener, Royal Shakespeare Company, UK cities, 1959
Freddie, Pygmalion, Royal Shakespeare Company, UK cities, 1960
Beyond the Fringe, US cities, 1963
The Bed Before Yesterday, US cities, 1976
Pellinore, Camelot, US cities, 1980–81
Also toured with the Andrew McMaster Company, UK cities, 1957.

Director
The Circle, Shaw Festival, 1967
The Chemmy Circle, Shaw Festival, 1968
A Flea in Her Ear, Charles Playhouse, 1969
Forty Years On, Shaw Festival, 1970
The Secretary Bird, Main Stage, Vancouver, British Columbia, Canada, 1970
The Chemmy Circle, Main Stage, Vancouver, British Columbia, Canada, 1971
The Sorrows of Frederick, Main Stage, Vancouver, British Columbia, Canada, 1971
Misalliance, Shaw Festival, 1972
Getting Married, Shaw Festival, 1972
Charley's Aunt, Shaw Festival, 1972
Widowers' Houses, Shaw Festival, 1973
Arms and the Man, Main Stage, Vancouver, British Columbia, Canada, 1973
The Crucifer of Blood, Elitch Gardens Theatre, Denver, Colorado, USA, 1979
Misalliance, Walnut Street Theatre, Philadelphia, PA, then Old Globe Theatre, San Diego, USA, 1982
The Real Thing, Seattle Repertory Theatre, WA, USA, 1986
Beyond the Fringe, Old Globe Theatre, San Diego, transferring to the Los Angeles Theatre Centre, USA, 1986

Writer

Filmography

Film

Television

References

External links
 
 
 
 Paxton Whitehead at the Internet Theatre Database
 Paxton Whitehead at Broadway World.com

1937 births
Living people
Alumni of the Webber Douglas Academy of Dramatic Art
English male film actors
English male television actors
English theatre directors
People from East Malling
Male actors from Kent
Canadian artistic directors
Canadian theatre directors